Isabella Williams (née Brough; 1806 – 8 August 1882) was a New Zealand businesswoman. She established and managed a drapery store in Christchurch, New Zealand, in the late nineteenth century.

Biography 
Williams was born in Perthshire, Scotland, probably in 1806, as she was baptised at Errol on 25 January 1807. Her mother was Mary Valentine and her father, Charles Brough, was a labourer.

When she was 25 years old, she married John Williams, a baker and confectioner. In 1850 the couple, with their two sons and five daughters, emigrated to New Zealand on the Randolph, one of the First Four Ships of settlers to sail from England to Lyttelton, New Zealand. The ship arrived on 16 December 1850 and a few days later the Williams decided that John would make the journey over the Port Hills to the new settlement of Christchurch to view their town section alone while Isabella and the children stayed in the immigration barracks in Lyttelton. Tragically, John Williams had a stroke while walking up the hills and died.

The Anglican reverend Edward Puckle opened a subscription fund to raise money for Williams, and the Deans brothers, who were also settlers from Scotland, invited her to stay at their property in Riccarton. Williams initially sold her husband's baking supplies, such as yeast, to fellow settlers, and then in 1852 opened a drapery business in Colombo Street opposite Market Place (now Victoria Square). She imported goods from Scotland and called the business Glasgow House. Williams retired in 1871 and sold the business as a going concern. It eventually became part of a department store, T.J. Armstrong's.

Williams died on 8 August 1882 and was buried at Barbadoes Street Cemetery.

References

19th-century New Zealand businesspeople
19th-century New Zealand businesswomen
Scottish emigrants to New Zealand
1806 births
1882 deaths
People from Perthshire
Canterbury Pilgrims
New Zealand women in business
Burials at Barbadoes Street Cemetery
New Zealand drapers